Elgood is an unincorporated community in Mercer County, West Virginia, United States.

History 
The community's name is an amalgamation of L. Goodwin.

Culture
Elgood School
Elgood Store

References

Unincorporated communities in West Virginia
Unincorporated communities in Mercer County, West Virginia